Eucalyptus prolixa, commonly known as the square-fruited mallet, is a species of mallet that is endemic to the southwest of Western Australia. It has smooth bark, glossy green, lance-shaped adult leaves, flower buds in groups of seven, creamy white flowers and urn-shaped fruit that is square in cross-section.

Description
Eucalyptus prolixa is an erect-stemmed mallet with a steep, branching habit, that typically grows to a height of  but does not form a lignotuber. It has smooth grey and tan bark. Flowering mainly occurs from September to December and the flowers are creamy white.

Taxonomy and naming
Eucalyptus prolixa was first formally described in 2000 by Dean Nicolle in the journal Nuytsia from material collected near the Daniell railway siding, north of Salmon Gums. The specific epithet (prolixa) is from the Latin prolixus meaning "stretched out", referring to the fruit and also the slender habit of this species.

Distribution and habitat
The square-fruited mallet is found between Kondinin, Coolgardie, Norseman and Salmon Gums on flat and undulating country.

Conservation status
This eucalypt is classified as "not threatened" by the Western Australian Government Department of Parks and Wildlife,

See also
List of Eucalyptus species

References

Eucalypts of Western Australia
prolixa
Myrtales of Australia
Plants described in 2000